Until 1 January 2007 Nørre-Snede was a municipality (Danish, kommune) in the former Vejle County on the Jutland peninsula in central Denmark. Its last mayor was Uffe Henneberg, a member of the Venstre (Liberal Party) political party. The main town and the site of its municipal council is the town of Nørre Snede.

merged a number of existing parishes:
 Ejstrup Parish
 Klovborg Parish
 Nørre-Snede Parish

Nørre-Snede municipality ceased to exist as the result of Kommunalreformen ("The Municipality Reform" of 2007). It was merged with existing Brande and Ikast municipalities to form the new Ikast-Brande municipality. The new municipality belonged to Region Midtjylland ("Mid-Jutland Region").

Notable people
 Jes Bertelsen (born 1946), spiritual teacher and author

References 
Municipal statistics: NetBorger Kommunefakta, delivered from KMD aka Kommunedata (Municipal Data)
Municipal mergers and neighbors: Eniro new municipalities map

External links
Ikast-Brande municipality's official website (Danish only)
Noerresnede.dk (Danish only)

Former municipalities of Denmark